Wingz (originally known as Tickengo) is a vehicle for hire company that provides private, scheduled, and fixed-price rides in 30 major cities across the United States via mobile app. The service provides rides anywhere in the cities it serves, with a focus on airports. Wingz offers the ability to request specific drivers for rides and allows users to build a list of their favorite drivers for future bookings.

The company is based in San Francisco, California.

Along with a dedicated desktop and mobile site that can be used for creating an account and booking a ride, Wingz operates mobile apps for the iOS and Android platforms. Riders must sign up with an email address and phone number before booking their first ride.

Users can book rides from two hours to up to one year in advance. If a passenger’s ride includes a trip to or from the airport, users are able to input their flight info to help keep their driver updated about the status of the arriving or departing flight.

In addition to a special request section (where passengers can ask for amenities like car seats, phone chargers, etc.), riders can also submit additional information regarding oversized bags or traveling with a large pet in order to convey how large of a vehicle is needed for the trip.

Every Wingz driver has a unique driver “code” that can be added to a rider’s “Favorite Drivers List” online or through the app. Each time a user requests a ride, their Favorite Driver receives the first opportunity to accept the ride—and so on down the list—until somebody is able to provide the trip. If none of a user’s favorite drivers are available, the request is distributed to the standard pool of drivers.

All Wingz rides are flat-rate, meaning they do not undergo other companies’ volatile pricing shifts that surge during phases of low supply or high demand. Once a rider requests a booking, they are presented up front with their price for the trip; all transactions must be made by credit card and are not charged until a ride is provided.

Drivers on the platform receive a higher percentage of the passenger’s fare than a vast majority of other car services and get an additional percentage of the ride price if they’re requested as a Favorite Driver.

After the ride is complete, users are able to rate their driver and compensate them with a gratuity that goes directly to them. Drivers who do not maintain a high rating are removed from the platform.

Safety

Drivers
Wingz drivers undergo an extensive vetting process that involves a more thorough assessment than traditional rideshare services, resulting in only 5% of drivers being accepted into the program. Drivers must be at least 21 years old and are individually trained, interviewed, and background/DMV record-checked. Wingz maintains a zero-tolerance policy towards drug and alcohol use and regularly schedules interviews with their drivers to ensure high levels of service.

Insurance 
Wingz provides its riders and passengers with a $1 million or $1.5 million (depending on the market) per incident liability policy. All vehicles are inspected by professionals and must have been manufactured in the last five years.

History

Establishment 
Wingz (originally known as Tickengo) was founded by Geoff Mathieux, Jeremie Romand, Fred Gomez and Christof Baumbach in April 2011.  Tickengo was originally a ride-sharing platform matching drivers and passengers going to the same destination.

In October 2011, Tickengo was the first company in the world to introduce the concept of a peer-to-peer ride online platform, where non-commercial drivers could accept any posted ride request to make some money, even if they were not going to the same destination.  This was made available through the Tickengo website.

In October 2012, Tickengo received a "cease and desist" letter from the California Public Utilities Commission (CPUC). The company was the first to submit a brief to the CPUC arguing for the legalization of ridesharing companies.

In November 2013, California regulators formally legalized ride-sharing services, classifying them as “Transportation Network Companies”. Thus, Tickengo was the first company in the world to get a license for ride-sharing, before Lyft and Uber obtained theirs.  In early 2014 Tickengo rebranded as Wingz.

Willie Brown, former Mayor of San Francisco, served as lawyer and advisor to Wingz, representing the company before the California Public Utilities Commission.

Funding 
In March 2015, Wingz announced that it had raised $2.7M in equity funding from Ocotea Holdings, Florence Ventures, Blue Angels Ventures, Big Bloom Investments, Binux Capital, Bright Success Capital Limited, Olive Tree, Jack Russo, David Chen, Vincent Ma, Larry Marcus, Xavier Niel and other angel investors.

In July 2015, Wingz received an additional $11M in equity funding from Expedia Inc. and Marc Benioff, CEO of Salesforce.com.

City Presence 
Since obtaining its CPUC license in 2013, Wingz has served airports and cities throughout the U.S.

Currently, Wingz operates at the following airports:

Austin
 Austin-Bergstrom International Airport (AUS)

Dallas
 Dallas Love Field (DAL)
 Dallas/Fort Worth International Airport (DFW)

Houston
 George Bush Intercontinental Airport (IAH)
 William P. Hobby Airport (HOU)

Los Angeles
 Burbank Bob Hope Airport (BUR)
 John Wayne Airport (SNA)
 Long Beach Airport (LGB)
 Los Angeles International Airport (LAX) - drop off only
 Ontario International Airport (ONT)

Miami
 Miami International Airport (MIA)

Orlando
 Orlando International Airport (MCO)

Phoenix
 Phoenix Sky Harbor International Airport (PHX)

Portland
 Portland International Airport (PDX)

Sacramento
 Sacramento International Airport (SMF)

San Antonio
 San Antonio International Airport (SAT)

San Diego
 San Diego International Airport (SAN)

Seattle
 Seattle-Tacoma International Airport (SEA)

SF Bay Area
 Mineta San Jose International Airport (SJC)
 Oakland International Airport (OAK)
 San Francisco International Airport (SFO)

Tampa
 Tampa International Airport (TPA)

References

External links
 Wingz

Companies based in San Francisco
2011 establishments in California
Ridesharing companies of the United States